de Brancas is a surname:

 André de Brancas (d.1595), Admiral of France
 Jean-Baptiste de Brancas (1693-1770), French bishop
 Louis, Marquis of Brancas and Prince of Nisaro, also known as "Louis-Henri de Brancas-Forcalquier" and "Louis de Brancas de Forcalquier de Céreste" (1672-1750), Marshal of France
 Henri-Ignace de Brancas, Bishop of Lisieux 1714–1760, brother of the above Louis
 Louis-Léon de Brancas (1733-1824), 3rd duc de Lauraguais, 6th duc de Villars, French author
 Nicola de Brancas, Bishop of Marseille 1445-1466
 Marie Françoise de Brancas (d.1715), wife of Alphonse Henri, Count of Harcourt, rebuilt the Château d'Harcourt
 duc de Brancas, any of a number of hereditary office-holders under the Ancien Régime of France

fr:Famille de Brancas